Mickie Jay Henson (1963 – February 14, 2022) was an American professional wrestling referee. He was best known for his time with World Championship Wrestling in 1992–2001 and World Wrestling Entertainment (WWE) in 2005–2009.

Professional wrestling career

Championship Wrestling from Florida (1987–1991)
Henson wrestled for independent promotions in Florida and was an enhancement talent on World Wrestling Federation television in the early 1990s. He broke into the business with the help of Steve Keirn, Mike Graham, and Gordon Solie. In 1987 he refereed his first match for Championship Wrestling from Florida. According to Henson, “My first match was in Orlando, Fla., at the Eddie Graham Sports Complex. I think it's been turned into apartment buildings now. The match was between Bob Cook and a young Mike Awesome. I wasn't really all that nervous. I had watched it on television forever. I paid attention to the referees, and when I got out there I kind of just fell into it. I was lucky enough to learn from some of the best workers of the time like Dick Slater and Mike Graham so it was pretty easy to catch on.”

World Wrestling Federation (1992–1993)
In 1992, Henson was a jobber in the WWF appearing on Superstars and Wrestling Challenge. He faced The Undertaker, Rick Martel, Sid Vicious, Skinner and The Nasty Boys.

World Championship Wrestling (1992–2001)
Jim Crockett Promotions eventually took over the area and Henson began refereeing in World Championship Wrestling (WCW) in 1992. Henson refereed the main event at Starrcade in 1998 between WCW Champion Goldberg and Kevin Nash, which Nash won. He also refereed the Bret Hart-Chris Benoit match in honor of the late Owen Hart.

On February 15, 2000, Henson wrestled against Mark Johnson on WCW Thunder in which Johnson won.

When Vince McMahon bought WCW in March 2001, Henson was out of the job.

World Wrestling Entertainment (2005–2009)
After he was signed by World Wrestling Entertainment (WWE) in 2005 he was placed on the Raw brand officiating matches, such as the John Cena versus Kurt Angle WWE Championship match at Survivor Series in 2005 and the Hardcore match between Edge and Mick Foley at WrestleMania 22.

He continued to officiate matches on Raw for nine months until 2006 when he was moved over to the newly established ECW brand. He made his debut for the brand on July 18 edition, officiating a match between Mike Knox and The Sandman, as well as the main event ECW World Championship match between The Big Show and The Undertaker. He was named the ECW brand head official shortly after. Despite moving to SmackDown! in February 2007, he was featured as the only ECW brand referee in WWE SmackDown vs. Raw 2008.

In February 2007, Henson was moved to the SmackDown! brand and later became its head official. In late 2008, WWE made the decision to have universal referees, in which referees were to appear on every brand, which included Henson. He was then pulled off the road in 2008 due to health issues. On January 14, 2009, Henson was released from his contract with WWE.

Personal life and death
Henson stated that he liked to go fishing. He lived in Key West, Florida, for about 16 years.  He was diagnosed with Mantle cell lymphoma in 2008, and given months to live. However, he was able beat the cancer. Henson died from COVID-19 pneumonia on February 14, 2022, at age 59.

Accomplishments
Cauliflower Alley Club
Charlie Smith Referee’s Award (2018)

References

External links
 WWE Profile (Archived)
 Cagematch.net Profile

1963 births
2022 deaths
American male professional wrestlers
Professional wrestling referees
Deaths from the COVID-19 pandemic in Florida
Deaths from pneumonia in Florida
Sportspeople from Tampa, Florida